Cotacachi may refer to:
Cotacachi Volcano, a dormant volcano in western Imbabura Province, Ecuador
Cotacachi, a city near the volcano
Cotacachi Canton, a canton around the city
Cotacachi Cayapas Ecological Reserve, a national park around the volcano